Kimberley Smith (born 19 November 1981) is a New Zealand middle-distance and long-distance runner who retired in 2016.

Life 
She is a 2005 graduate of Providence College (previously at Auckland's King's College. She first started running with Papakura Harriers. Smith won the 2004 NCAA Women's Individual Cross Country Championship. She won three NCAA individual titles in indoor track (5,000 metres and 3,000 metres) and outdoor track (5,000 metres) during the 2003–04 season. Her four NCAA individual championships are the most by any runner in Providence College history. In 2004, she won the Honda Sports Award as the nation's best female collegiate track and field athlete, then in 2005 won the Honda Sports Award as the nation's best female collegiate cross country runner.

She set a national record in the marathon with a run at the 2010 London Marathon—she finished eighth in the women's race and recorded a time of 2:25:21. Her result was upgraded to sixth after Russian athletes Liliya Shobukhova and Inga Abitova were removed from the results for doping. She ran the fastest half marathon by a woman on United States soil when she won the 2011 Rock 'n’ Roll Mardi Gras Half Marathon in 1:07:36. Smith was leading the women's field of the 2011 Boston Marathon by 50 seconds at the halfway point, but injured her leg at mile 15 and was forced to drop from the race with roughly seven miles remaining. She ran at the inaugural B.A.A. 10K in June and came second behind the Boston Marathon winner Caroline Kilel. Smith established herself as the seventh-fastest runner ever at the Rock 'n' Roll Philadelphia Half Marathon, where she improved upon Meseret Defar's course record with a time of 1:07:11. She entered the 2011 New York City Marathon two months later and finished in fifth place with a time of 2:25:46. She finished 6th in Yokohama Marathon on 18 November 2012 in 2:27

At the 2012 New York City Half Marathon she was leading alongside Firehiwot Dado before finally finishing second behind the Ethiopian. She ran a course record at the Boston 10K, beating reigning champion Kilel with a run of 31:36 minutes. She placed fifteenth in the 2012 Olympic marathon in London and won the Boston Half Marathon to claim the BAA Distance Medley jackpot of $100,000. In September 2012 she married fellow runner Patrick Tarpy. They have two children.

Smith was runner-up to Olympic marathon champion Tiki Gelana at the 2013 Kagawa Marugame Half Marathon.

In 2016, her last year of professional running, she finished third at the Stanford Invitational 5K in 15:32.

Smith was contracted by New Balance and still holds many New Zealand national records. She also holds the Oceanian records for the 3000, 5000 and 10,000 metres.  Currently, she resides in Providence, Rhode Island.

Achievements

Personal bests

Outdoor

Indoor

NR indicates a New Zealand national record

References

External links
 
 Athletics New Zealand profile for Kimberley Smith

1981 births
Living people
Athletes (track and field) at the 2004 Summer Olympics
Athletes (track and field) at the 2008 Summer Olympics
Athletes (track and field) at the 2012 Summer Olympics
New Zealand expatriate sportspeople in the United States
New Zealand female long-distance runners
New Zealand female marathon runners
New Zealand female middle-distance runners
Olympic athletes of New Zealand
People educated at King's College, Auckland
People from Papakura
Providence College alumni
Athletes from Auckland
Universiade medalists in athletics (track and field)
Universiade gold medalists for New Zealand